The 1986–87 season was Paris Saint-Germain's 17th season in existence. PSG played their home league games at the Parc des Princes in Paris, registering an average attendance of 20,312 spectators per match. The club was presided by Francis Borelli and the team was coached by Gérard Houllier. Jean-Marc Pilorget was the team captain.

Summary

The follow-up to the league title was not as glorious though. Key players Luis Fernandez, Jean-Claude Lemoult and Thierry Morin departed ahead of 1986–87 and PSG tried to replace them with more gunpowder up front. Gérard Houllier brought in forwards Vahid Halilhodžić, Daniel Xuereb and Jules Bocandé, all of whom joined Dominique Rocheteau in an extremely attack-minded yet unbalanced squad. The end result was a 7th-place finish in the league, an early exit from the French Cup and a disappointing first European Cup appearance, getting knocked out by Czech minnows Vítkovice in the first round.

Players 

As of the 1986–87 season.

Squad

Out on loan

Transfers 

As of the 1986–87 season.

Arrivals

Departures

Kits 

French radio RTL and French premium television channel Canal+ were the shirt sponsors. German sportswear brand Adidas was the kit manufacturer.

Friendly tournaments

Coupe d'Été

Second round (Group 3)

Tournoi de Paris

Challenge des Champions

Tournoi Indoor de Jérusalem

Tournoi Indoor de Paris-Bercy

First group stage (Group B)

Second group stage (Winners Group)

Competitions

Overview

Division 1

League table

Results by round

Matches

Coupe de France

Round of 64

Round of 32

European Cup

First round

Statistics

As of the 1986–87 season.

Appearances and goals

|-
!colspan="16" style="background:#dcdcdc; text-align:center"|Goalkeepers

|-
!colspan="16" style="background:#dcdcdc; text-align:center"|Defenders

|-
!colspan="16" style="background:#dcdcdc; text-align:center"|Midfielders

|-
!colspan="16" style="background:#dcdcdc; text-align:center"|Forwards

|-

References

External links 

Official websites
 PSG.FR - Site officiel du Paris Saint-Germain
 Paris Saint-Germain - Ligue 1 
 Paris Saint-Germain - UEFA.com

Paris Saint-Germain F.C. seasons
French football clubs 1986–87 season